Kąty  is a village in the administrative district of Gmina Sochaczew, within Sochaczew County, Masovian Voivodeship, in east-central Poland.

The village has an approximate population of 508.

References

Villages in Sochaczew County